"The Image of You" is a song by Albanian singer Anjeza Shahini. The song was composed by Edmond Zhulali and written by Agim Doçi. Radio Televizioni Shqiptar (RTSH) released it as a CD single in 2004. A rhythmic English-language electropop ballad, the song lyrically explores a woman's emotions in what appears to be a whirlwind romance. "The Image of You" represented  in the Eurovision Song Contest 2004 in Istanbul, Turkey, after Shahini won the national selection competition, Festivali i Këngës 42, with the song's Albanian-language version "Dua të jem imazhi yt". The country attempted its debut in the contest and reached the 7th place in a field of 24, receiving a total of 106 points. During her minimalistic show of the song, Shahini was accompanied on stage by four backing vocalists.

Background and composition 

In late 2003, Anjeza Shahini was announced as one of the contestants selected to compete in the 42nd edition of Festivali i Këngës, a competition to determine Albania's entrant for the Eurovision Song Contest 2004. Following the competition's rules, the lyrics of the participating entries had to be in the Albanian language. Shahini took part with the song "Dua të jem imazhi yt", composed by Edmond Zhulali and written by Agim Doçi. For the purpose of the singer's Eurovision Song Contest participation, "Dua të jem imazhi yt" was remastered and translated to "The Image of You". Musically, the latter is a moderately-paced rhythm English-language electropop ballad. It lyrically explores the singer's emotions in what seems to be a whirlwind romance.

At Eurovision

Festivali i Këngës 

The national broadcaster of Albania, Radio Televizioni Shqiptar (RTSH), organised the 42nd edition of Festivali i Këngës to determine Albania's representative for the Eurovision Song Contest 2004. The competition consisted of two semi-finals on 18 and 19 December, respectively, and the grand final on 20 December 2003. Anjeza Shahini emerged as the winner with "Imazhi yt" and was simultaneously announced as the country's representative for the Eurovision Song Contest 2004.

Istanbul 

The 49th edition of the Eurovision Song Contest took place in Istanbul, Turkey, and consisted of a semi-final on 12 May and the grand final three days later on 15 May 2004. For the first time, a semi-final round was introduced to accommodate the influx of nations that wanted to compete in the contest.

A debuting country, Albania was set to compete in the semi-final of the Eurovision Song Contest 2004 at position 13, following  and preceding . At the end of the show, the nation was announced among the top 10 entries of the semi-final and therefore qualified to compete in the grand final of the contest. In the grand final, it was announced that it would be performing ninth, following  and preceding . Albania finished in seventh position, being awarded a total of 106 points. During her minimalistic performance of the song, Shahini was accompanied on stage by four backing vocalists.

Track listings 

CD
"The Image of You"3:00

Digital download
"Dua të jem imazhi yt (Festivali i Këngës)"4:25

Release history

References 

2004 songs
2004 singles
2000s ballads
English-language Albanian songs
Electropop ballads
Eurovision songs of Albania
Eurovision songs of 2004